The Human Edge is a collection of science fiction stories by American writer Gordon R. Dickson.  It was first published by Baen Books in 2003 and was edited by Hank Davis.  Most of the stories originally appeared in the magazines Astounding SF, Analog Science Fiction and Fact, If, Fantasy and Science Fiction and Worlds of Tomorrow.

Contents

 "Introduction: The Dickson Edge", by Hank Davis
 "Danger—Human"
 "Sleight of Wit"
 "In the Bone"
 "3-Part Puzzle"
 "An Ounce of Emotion"
 "Brother Charlie"
 "The Game of Five"
 "Tiger Green"
 "The Hard Way"
 "Jackal’s Meal"
 "On Messenger Mountain"
 "The Catch"

Sources

2003 short story collections
Short story collections by Gordon R. Dickson
Books with cover art by David Burroughs Mattingly